Manuel M Lora Jr. is an American baseball coach and former pitcher. He played college baseball at Alabama A&M for coaches Michael Thompkins and Mitch Hill from 2009 to 2014. He returned to his alma mater in 2016 as an assistant coach. He served as the head coach of the Alabama A&M Bulldogs (2019–2020).

Playing career
Lora attended Hialeah-Miami Lakes High School in Hialeah, Florida. Lora played for the school's varsity baseball team. Lora then enrolled at Alabama A&M University, to play college baseball for the Alabama A&M Bulldogs baseball team.

During his first year on campus, Lora redshirted for the Bulldogs. During his freshman campaign, he made five starts in 15 total appearances and posted a 6.00 earned run average (ERA) and a 4–3 W–L record. Lora also registered 39 strikeouts (SO) and 33 walks (BB) in 42 innings pitched (IP). His four wins tied for the team lead.

In his sophomore year, Lora posted a 2–6 record in 10 starts with 50 SO and just 36 BB and a 5.31 ERA in 61 IP.

Coaching career
In 2016, Lora joined the Alabama A&M staff as the team's pitching coach and recruiting coordinator. On June 25, 2018, Mitch Hill resigned from his position at Alabama A&M and accepted the head coaching job at Martin Methodist College, and on August 7, 2018, Lora was named the interim head coach at Alabama A&M. On August 23, 2018, Lora was promoted to head coach of Alabama A&M. Lora would not return as head coach in 2021.

Head coaching record

References

External links

Alabama A&M Bulldogs bio

Living people
1991 births
American people of Spanish descent
Baseball pitchers
Alabama A&M Bulldogs baseball players
Alabama A&M Bulldogs baseball coaches